"Abrázame Muy Fuerte" (Hug Me Tightly) is a song written and performed by Mexican singer-songwriter Juan Gabriel. The song was produced and arranged by Bebu Silvetti and it was released as the second single from the album of the same title. The track became Gabriel's seventh number-one single in the Billboard Top Latin Songs chart. The parent album became commercially successful, peaking at number two in the Top Latin Albums chart in the United States. The singer also received a nomination for Best Latin Pop Album at the 44th Grammy Awards for this release.

Gabriel received three Billboard Latin Music Awards for the song, which was used as the main theme for the Mexican telenovela Abrázame Muy Fuerte, starring Victoria Ruffo, Aracely Arámbula and Fernando Colunga. In 2010, Puerto Rican-American singer-songwriter Marc Anthony recorded a cover version of the song for his album Iconos.

Background
Juan Gabriel is the most successful Hispanic author, selling over 40 million copies and with more than 300 artists who have recorded one or more of his 900 compositions in a career spanning over 30 years, wrote and performed in 2000 "Abrázame Muy Fuerte", which was included on his studio album of the same title. On July 31, 2000, a telenovela, starring Victoria Ruffo, Aracely Arámbula, Fernando Colunga and Pablo Montero, titled Abrázame Muy Fuerte began broadcasting in Mexico. Salvador Mejía, the producer, choose to use the song as its main theme. The telenovela became very successful and ended winning eight TVyNovelas Awards in 2001, including Best Telenovela, Best Actor and Best Supporting Actor. Gabriel re-recorded the song with Italian singer Laura Pausini which was included on the 2015 album Los Dúo.

Chart performance
The song debuted in the Billboard Top Latin Songs chart (formerly Hot Latin Tracks) at number 38 in the week of December 2, 2000, climbing to the top ten three weeks later, peaking at number-one on January 27, 2001, holding this position for four weeks, being replaced by MDO's "Te Quise Olvidar". "Abrázame" returned to the top of the chart the following week. The track was succeeded at number-one by "Sólo Quiero Amarte" performed by Ricky Martin five weeks later. "Abrázame Muy Fuerte" spent nine non-consecutive weeks at the top spot of the chart, and ended the year as the best performing Latin single of 2001. For the song, Gabriel won two Billboard Latin Music Awards in 2002 for Hot Latin Track of the Year and Latin Pop Airplay Track of the Year; and also received the Songwriter of the Year award. Bebu Silvetti earned the Producer of the Year award for his work on the track, which ranked 7th at the Hot Latin Songs 25th Anniversary chart. "Abrázame Muy Fuerte" also was awarded for Pop Song of the Year at the 2002 Lo Nuestro Awards.

Weekly charts

All-time charts

Marc Anthony version

Puerto Rican-American singer-songwriter Marc Anthony recorded a cover version of the song for his album Iconos in 2010. Anthony bought six hundred records to listen and select the songs that would be included on the album, the first of other cover albums that he will be releasing under this concept. Anthony recorded "Abrázame Muy Fuerte", "Ya lo Sé Que Tu Te Vas" and "Te Lo Pido por Favor", written by Juan Gabriel, since the songs were "related to his taste in music and who he was." "Abrázame Muy Fuerte" was chosen by the fans of the artist as the second single from the album, after a survey through his official website. This is also the second single by Marc Anthony to cover a song by Juan Gabriel since his recorded version of "Hasta Que Te Conocí" on his album Otra Nota in 1993.

Charts

See also
 List of number-one Billboard Hot Latin Tracks of 2001
 List of number-one Billboard Hot Latin Pop Airplay of 2001

References 

2000 singles
2010 singles
2015 songs
Juan Gabriel songs
Marc Anthony songs
Songs written by Juan Gabriel
Song recordings produced by Bebu Silvetti
Telenovela theme songs
2000 songs
RCA Records singles
Sony Music Latin singles
Spanish-language songs
Laura Pausini songs
2000s ballads